Trichopetalum whitei, common name Luray Caverns blind cave millipede, is a rare troglobitic (obligate cavernicolous) millipede of the upper Potomac River drainage in four Virginia counties and three West Virginia counties. It has been recorded from 12 caves across this range, including the Luray Caverns where it was first discovered and described.

Description
T. whitei is an eyeless, white (unpigmented) millipede. In common with all trichopetalids, it has rows of very elongate segmental setae extending in rows along the dorsal side. Proper identification requires microscopic examination and dissection of the gonopods (copulatory apparatus) by a specialist skilled in millipede identification.

Ecology and range
T. whitei is a troglobite and occurs only in caves, especially occurring on damp, rotting wood. T. whitei is presumably omnivorous, although nothing is known of its feeding preferences. Feeding is presumed to consist of picking up or scraping material from the substrate with the mouthparts then grinding with the mandibles.

The species is recorded from caves in the upper Potomac River drainage in Virginia (Augusta, Page, Rockingham, and Shenandoah Counties) and West Virginia (Hardy, Grant, and Pendleton Counties). However, if another cave millipede, T. weyeriensis, intergrades with T. whitei in Pendleton County and these two species are synonymous (as some workers believe), then the range of T. whitei would also extend into Greenbrier, Monroe and Pocahontas Counties in West Virginia.

Reproduction and life cycle
Nothing is known of the life history of this species. In related species, the male secretes sperm from pores on the coxae of the second legs into coxal sacs on the post-gonopodal legs. The secretions from the coxal sacs then form the seminal fluid into a spermatophore which is then transferred to the cyphopods of the female during mating.

Conservation status
T. whitei is considered globally vulnerable to extinction by NatureServe, with populations in West Virginia considered critically imperiled, and Virginia populations imperiled. T. whitei is designated as a Regional Forester Sensitive Species in the Monongahela National Forest in the Eastern Region of the Forest Service.

Taxonomy
T. whitei was first described as Zygonopus whitei by Ryder in 1881. It became Trichopetalum whitei with the synonymy of Zygonopus with Trichopetalum by Shear in 1972. Causey has suggested that Trichopetalum weyeriensis may be a subspecies of Trichopetalum whitei rather than a distinct species.

References

Further reading
Elliott, William R. (1998), "Conservation of the North American cave and karst biota" In Subterranean Biota (Series: Ecosystems of the World). Elsevier Science, Electronic preprint at www.utexas.edu/depts/tnhc/.www/biospeleology/preprint.htm. 29 pages. 

"Conservation Assessment for Luray Caverns Blind Cave Milliped" (Trichopetalum whitei) 8 
"Conservation Assessment for Luray Caverns Blind Cave Milliped" (Trichopetalum whitei) 9 
Schubart, O. (1934), "Tausendfüßler oder Myriapoda. 1: Diplopoda", In Die Tierwelt Deutschlands, 28 Teil. Jena: Gustav Fischer, 318 pages. 

Endemic fauna of the United States
Millipedes of North America
Cave millipedes
Animals described in 1881
Chordeumatida
Taxa named by John A. Ryder